Anil Kadam  is an Indian politician, from Nashik district. He is Member of the 13th Maharashtra Legislative Assembly from Niphad Vidhan Sabha constituency as member of Shiv Sena. He has been elected to Vidhan Sabha for two consecutive terms in 2009 and 2014.

Positions held

See also
 Dindori Lok Sabha constituency 
Narhari zirwal saheb

References

External links
 Shiv Sena Official website

Shiv Sena politicians
Maharashtra MLAs 2009–2014
Maharashtra MLAs 2014–2019
Living people
1973 births
People from Nashik district
Marathi politicians